Dmitri Ivanovich Kudinov (born 14 November 1985) is a Russian football manager. He is the manager of FC Fakel-M Voronezh.

External links
 Profile by Footballfacts

1985 births
Living people
Russian football managers